Lake Isabel is located in Glacier National Park, in the U. S. state of Montana. Lake Isabel is northeast of Battlement Mountain and northwest of Vigil Peak. Located in a remote region of Glacier National Park, Lake Isabel is a  roundtrip hike from Two Medicine Lake.

See also
List of lakes in Flathead County, Montana (A-L)

References

Isabel
Isabel